The Pennsylvania Railroad's steam locomotive class D2 (formerly Class B, pre-1895) comprised twenty 4-4-0 locomotives intended for mountain passenger helper service, constructed at the railroad's own Altoona Works (now owned by Norfolk Southern) during 1869–1880.
They were the second standardized class of locomotives on the railroad and shared many parts with other standard classes.

This design differed from the Class A (later D1) mainly in its smaller drivers for greater tractive effort in mountainous terrain.  Like all the early standardized 4-4-0s on the PRR, the Class B had a wagon-top boiler with steam dome and a firebox between the two driving axles.

In 1881, the PRR took the Class B design and modified it to produce more locomotives for express passenger service, with  drivers like the earlier Class A.  These new locomotives were designated Class B A, and were classified as B2a in the post-1895 scheme; forty-five of them were constructed.

References

4-4-0 locomotives
D02
Railway locomotives introduced in 1869
Scrapped locomotives
Standard gauge locomotives of the United States
Steam locomotives of the United States